The 1977 New Zealand Royal Visit Honours were appointments by Elizabeth II to the Royal Victorian Order, to mark her silver jubilee visit to New Zealand that year. They were announced on 22 February 1977.

The recipients of honours are displayed here as they were styled before their new honour.

Royal Victorian Order

Commander (CVO)
 Kennedy Berclay Burnside 
 Donald Francis Ross

Member, fourth class (MVO)
 John Lindell O'Sullivan 
 Kenneth Owen Thompson

In 1984, Members of the Royal Victorian Order, fourth class, were redesignated as Lieutenants of the Royal Victorian Order (LVO).

Member, fifth class (MVO)
 Cyril Glynn Clear
 Francis William Gaucheron Diment 
 Michael Fitzgerald
 Harold Eugene Symonds
 Major John Selwyn Thorn
 Captain Nicholas Thornton

Royal Victorian Medal

Silver (RVM)
 Gordon George McNab

References

1977 awards
Royal Visit Honours
Monarchy in New Zealand